The March 827 was a British sports prototype racing car, built by March Engineering in 1982 for the revived Can-Am series. As with all other full-size Can-Am cars of the time, it used a mid-mounted 5-litre, naturally-aspirated Chevrolet V8 engine. It was driven by Danny Sullivan for Newman/Budweiser racing. It won only 1 race in 1982, at Caesars Palace.

References

Sports prototypes
Can-Am cars
March vehicles